Richard R. Stout (September 21, 1912 – October 16, 1986) was an American politician who served in the New Jersey Senate from 1952 to 1974.

Born in the Ocean Grove section of Neptune Township, New Jersey, Stout attended Neptune High School, Lawrenceville School, Princeton University, and Newark Law School before becoming an attorney. He had also served in the U.S. Army during World War II from 1940 to 1946.

Stout first ran for the Senate in 1951 against incumbent Republican Senator J. Stanley Herbert with the support of the Monmouth County Republican Organization. He won the primary and subsequently the general election and represented the entire county from 1952 to 1966. During the 1958 session, he served as Senate President. After the 1965 elections which reorganized the Senate districts, he was elected at-large to the 5th district encompassing all of Monmouth and Ocean counties. In the 1967 and 1971 elections, he was elected at-large to the 5th district, only encompassing Monmouth County.

In the 1973 elections, Stout ran for reelection from the new 10th district comprising the southern shore communities of Monmouth County. He lost to Herbert J. Buehler by 10 points. He died of cardiac arrest on October 16, 1986, in Newark, New Jersey at age 74.

References

1912 births
1986 deaths
Lawrenceville School alumni
Republican Party New Jersey state senators
Majority leaders of the New Jersey Senate
Neptune High School alumni
Presidents of the New Jersey Senate
People from Neptune Township, New Jersey
People from Ocean Township, Monmouth County, New Jersey
20th-century American politicians
New Jersey lawyers
Rutgers School of Law–Newark alumni
Princeton University alumni
United States Army personnel of World War II
20th-century American lawyers